The 2018 Wimbledon Championships was a Grand Slam tennis tournament which took place at the All England Lawn Tennis and Croquet Club in Wimbledon, London, United Kingdom. The main tournament began on Monday, 2 July 2018 and finished on Sunday, 15 July 2018. Novak Djokovic won the gentlemen's singles title and Angelique Kerber won the ladies' singles title.

The 2018 tournament was the 132nd edition of The Championships, the 125th staging of the ladies' singles Championship event, the 51st in the Open Era and the third Grand Slam tournament of the year. It was played on grass courts and was part of the ATP World Tour, the WTA Tour, the ITF Junior tour and the NEC Tour. The tournament was organised by All England Lawn Tennis Club and International Tennis Federation.

Roger Federer and Garbiñe Muguruza were both unsuccessful in defending their 2017 titles. Federer lost in the quarterfinals to eventual finalist Kevin Anderson, while Muguruza lost in the second round to Alison Van Uytvanck.

Tournament 

The 2018 Wimbledon Championships was the 132nd edition of the tournament and was held at the All England Lawn Tennis and Croquet Club in London.

The tournament was run by the International Tennis Federation (ITF) and included in the 2018 ATP World Tour and the 2018 WTA Tour calendars under the Grand Slam category. The tournament consisted of men's (singles and doubles), women's (singles and doubles), mixed doubles, boys' (under 18 – singles and doubles) and girls' (under 18 – singles and doubles), which was also a part of the Grade A category of tournaments for under 18, and singles and doubles events for men's and women's wheelchair tennis players as part of the UNIQLO Tour under the Grand Slam category.

The tournament was played only on grass courts; the main draw matches were played at the All England Lawn Tennis and Croquet Club, Wimbledon. Qualifying matches were played, from Monday 25 June to Thursday 28 June 2018, at the Bank of England Sports Ground, Roehampton. The Tennis sub-committee met to decide wild card entries on 19 June.

Point and prize money distribution

Point distribution 
Below is the tables with the point distribution for each phase of the tournament.

Senior points

Wheelchair points

Junior points

Prize money 
The Wimbledon total prize money for 2018 had increased to £34,000,000, up by 7.6% on 2017. The winners of the men's and women's singles titles will earn £2.25m. Prize money for the men's and women's doubles and wheelchair players were also increased for the 2018 competition.

A new rule in 2018 was that any first round singles player who is unfit to play and withdraws on-site after 12pm on Thursday before the start of the Main Draw will now receive half of the First Round prize money, the other half to be awarded to the replacement lucky loser. Any player who competes in the First Round Main Draw singles and retires or performs below professional standards, may now be subject to a fine of up to First Round prize money, to deter players from appearing only to claim prize money.

* per team

Singles players

Gentlemen's singles

Ladies' singles

Day-by-day summaries

Singles seeds

Gentlemen's singles 
The seeds for men's singles are adjusted on a surface-based system to reflect more accurately the individual player's grass court achievement as per the following formula, which applies to the top 32 players according to the ATP rankings on 25 June 2018:
 Take Entry System Position points at 25 June 2018.
 Add 100% points earned for all grass court tournaments in the past 12 months (26 June 2017 – 24 June 2018).
 Add 75% points earned for best grass court tournament in the 12 months before that (20 June 2016 – 25 June 2017).

Rank and points before are as of 2 July 2018.

† The player did not qualify for the tournament in 2017 but is defending points from the 2017 ATP Challenger Tour instead.

Withdrawn players

Ladies' singles 
The seeds for ladies' singles are based on the WTA rankings as of 25 June 2018, with an exception for Serena Williams (details are given below). Rank and points before are as of 2 July 2018.

† The player did not qualify for the tournament in 2017. Accordingly, points for her 16th-best result are deducted instead.
‡ Serena Williams was ranked outside the top 150 on the day when seeds were announced, because she missed most of the last 12-month period due to her pregnancy. Nevertheless, she was deemed a special case and seeded 25th by the organisers.

Doubles seeds

Gentlemen's doubles 

1 Rankings were as of 25 June 2018.

Ladies' doubles 

1 Rankings were as of 25 June 2018.

Mixed doubles 

1 Rankings were as of 2 July 2018.

Champions

Seniors

Gentlemen's singles 

  Novak Djokovic def.  Kevin Anderson, 6–2, 6–2, 7–6(7–3)

Ladies' singles 

  Angelique Kerber def.  Serena Williams, 6–3, 6–3

Gentlemen's doubles 

  Mike Bryan /  Jack Sock def.  Raven Klaasen /  Michael Venus, 6–3, 6–7(7–9), 6–3, 5–7, 7–5

Ladies' doubles 

  Barbora Krejčíková /  Kateřina Siniaková def.  Nicole Melichar /  Květa Peschke, 6–4, 4–6, 6–0

Mixed doubles 

  Alexander Peya /  Nicole Melichar def.  Jamie Murray /  Victoria Azarenka, 7–6(7–1), 6–3

Juniors

Boys' singles 

  Tseng Chun-hsin def.  Jack Draper, 6–1, 6–7(2–7), 6–4

Girls' singles 

  Iga Świątek def.  Leonie Küng, 6–4, 6–2

Boys' doubles 

  Yankı Erel /  Otto Virtanen def.  Nicolás Mejía /  Ondřej Štyler, 7–6(7–5), 6–4

Girls' doubles 

  Wang Xinyu /  Wang Xiyu def.  Caty McNally /  Whitney Osuigwe, 6–2, 6–1

Invitation

Gentlemen's invitation doubles 

  Tommy Haas /  Mark Philippoussis def.  Colin Fleming /  Xavier Malisse, 7–6(7–4), 6–4

Ladies' invitation doubles 

  Kim Clijsters /  Rennae Stubbs def.  Cara Black /  Martina Navratilova, 6–3, 6–4

Senior gentlemen's invitation doubles 

  Jonas Björkman /  Todd Woodbridge def.  Richard Krajicek /  Mark Petchey, 6–4, 6–3

Wheelchair events

Wheelchair gentlemen's singles 

  Stefan Olsson def.  Gustavo Fernández, 6–2, 0–6, 6–3

Wheelchair ladies' singles 

  Diede de Groot def.  Aniek van Koot, 6–3, 6–2

Wheelchair gentlemen's doubles 

  Alfie Hewett /  Gordon Reid def.  Joachim Gérard /  Stefan Olsson, 6–1, 6–4

Wheelchair ladies' doubles 

  Diede de Groot /  Yui Kamiji def.  Sabine Ellerbrock /  Lucy Shuker, 6–1, 6–1

Wheelchair quad doubles 

  Andrew Lapthorne /  David Wagner def.  Dylan Alcott /  Lucas Sithole, 6–2, 6–3

Main draw wild card entries 
The following players received wild cards into the main draw senior events.

Gentlemen's singles 
  Liam Broady
  Jay Clarke
  Denis Kudla
  Sergiy Stakhovsky

Ladies' singles 
  Katie Boulter
  Naomi Broady
  Harriet Dart
  Katy Dunne
  Ons Jabeur
  Tereza Smitková
  Katie Swan
  Gabriella Taylor

Gentlemen's doubles 
 Luke Bambridge /  Jonny O'Mara
 Alex Bolt /  Lleyton Hewitt
 Liam Broady /  Scott Clayton
 Jay Clarke /  Cameron Norrie
 Jürgen Melzer /  Daniel Nestor
 Frederik Nielsen /  Joe Salisbury

Ladies' doubles 
 Katie Boulter /  Katie Swan
 Naomi Broady /  Asia Muhammad
 Harriet Dart /  Katy Dunne

Mixed doubles 
  Luke Bambridge /  Katie Boulter
  Jay Clarke /  Harriet Dart
  Dominic Inglot /  Samantha Stosur
  Thanasi Kokkinakis /  Ashleigh Barty
  Joe Salisbury /  Katy Dunne

Main draw qualifier entries

Gentlemen's singles 

  Christian Harrison
  Ruben Bemelmans
  Dennis Novak
  Grégoire Barrère
  Stefano Travaglia
  Norbert Gombos
  Stéphane Robert
  Jason Kubler
  Yannick Maden
  John-Patrick Smith
  Christian Garín
  Ernests Gulbis
  Alex Bolt
  Benjamin Bonzi
  Bradley Klahn
  Thomas Fabbiano

Lucky losers
  Bernard Tomic
  Peter Polansky
  Michael Mmoh
  Hubert Hurkacz
  Lorenzo Sonego
  Simone Bolelli
  Jason Jung

Ladies' singles 

  Alexandra Dulgheru
  Eugenie Bouchard
  Sara Sorribes Tormo
  Antonia Lottner
  Claire Liu
  Vera Zvonareva
  Viktoriya Tomova
  Mona Barthel
  Evgeniya Rodina
  Elena-Gabriela Ruse
  Vitalia Diatchenko
  Barbora Štefková

Lucky losers
   Mariana Duque Mariño
  Caroline Dolehide

Gentlemen's doubles 

  Sriram Balaji /  Vishnu Vardhan
  Kevin Krawietz /  Andreas Mies
  Andre Begemann /  Yasutaka Uchiyama
  Austin Krajicek /  Jeevan Nedunchezhiyan

Ladies' doubles 

  Ysaline Bonaventure /  Bibiane Schoofs
  Alexa Guarachi /  Erin Routliffe
  Han Xinyun /  Luksika Kumkhum
  Arina Rodionova /  Maryna Zanevska
The following pairs received entry as lucky losers:
  Nicola Geuer /  Viktorija Golubic
  Georgina García Pérez /  Fanny Stollár
  Anna Blinkova /  Markéta Vondroušová

Protected ranking 
The following players were accepted directly into the main draw using a protected ranking:

 Gentlemen's Singles
  James Duckworth (PR 105)
  Yoshihito Nishioka (PR 66)

 Ladies' Singles
  Serena Williams (PR 1)
  Zheng Saisai (PR 88)

Withdrawals 
The following players were accepted directly into the main tournament but withdrew with injuries, suspensions, or personal reasons:

 Gentlemen's Singles
  Roberto Bautista Agut → replaced by  Peter Polansky
  Tomáš Berdych → replaced by  Guido Andreozzi
  Chung Hyeon → replaced by  Lorenzo Sonego
  Alexandr Dolgopolov → replaced by  Simone Bolelli
  Nicolás Kicker → replaced by  Dudi Sela
  Lu Yen-hsun → replaced by  Bernard Tomic
  Andy Murray → replaced by  Jason Jung
  Andrey Rublev → replaced by  Hubert Hurkacz
  Viktor Troicki → replaced by  Michael Mmoh
  Jo-Wilfried Tsonga → replaced by  Laslo Đere

 Ladies' Singles
  Timea Bacsinszky → replaced by  Mariana Duque Mariño
  Catherine Bellis → replaced by  Arantxa Rus
  Zarina Diyas → replaced by  Caroline Dolehide
  Sara Errani → replaced by  Viktorija Golubic
  Beatriz Haddad Maia → replaced by  Anna Blinkova
  Laura Siegemund → replaced by  Jana Fett
  Elena Vesnina → replaced by  Andrea Petkovic

References

External links 
 

 
Wimbledon Championships
Wimbledon Championships
Wimbledon Championships
Wimbledon Championships
Wimbledon Championships
Wimbledon Championships